Netball at the 2009 Pacific Mini Games in Rarotonga, Cook Islands was held during September 2009.

Preliminary round

Pool A

Pool B

5th/6th match

Semi-finals

Third place match

Final

Final standings

See also
 Netball at the Pacific Mini Games

References

2009 Pacific Mini Games
Pacific Mini Games
Netball at the Pacific Games
International netball competitions hosted by the Cook Islands